Eva Robin's (born Roberto Coatti; 10 December 1958) is a transgender Italian actress, model, and activist from Bologna, Italy. Perhaps best known for her role in Dario Argento's 1982 giallo film Tenebrae.

Eva was assigned male at birth. From the age of about thirteen she says she felt she was female. When she was sixteen, she met a neighbor who was transgender and who introduced her to feminizing hormones. By the age of twenty-one she was living as a woman. Eva says she doesn't want sex reassignment surgery, saying she feels comfortable with her body and has no desire to change.

Contrary to conflicting mentions, Eva currently does spell her last name with an apostrophe in it. She took her nom de plume from a character in Italy's Diabolik comics, Eva Kant, and writer Harold Robbins. While on holiday in Sardinia she saw the name "Robbins" spelled as "Robin's" and decided to take on that particular spelling.

Filmography 
La cerimonia dei sensi (1979)
Eva man (Due sessi in uno) (1980)
El regreso de Eva Man (1982)
Tenebrae (1982)
Hercules (1983)
The Adventures of Hercules (1985)
Lupo solitario - TV series (1987)
Mascara (1987)
Massacre Play (1989)
Valentina - TV series (1989)
L'odissea - TV movie (1991)
Belle al bar  (1994)
Luna e l'altra (1996)
Il primo estratto (1997)
My Dearest Friends (1998)
Il bello delle donne - TV series (2002)
Cattive inclinazioni (2003)
Di che peccato sei? - TV movie (2007)
Il segreto di Rahil (2007)
Tutte le donne della mia vita (2007)
Andres and me (2007)

Notes

External links 
 

1958 births
Living people
Transgender actresses
Transgender women
Transgender female models
Italian transgender people
Italian LGBT actors
Italian film actresses
Italian television actresses
20th-century Italian actresses
21st-century Italian actresses
Actors from Bologna